People v Schmidt, 216 N.Y. 324 (1915), is a criminal case interpreting "wrong" in the M'Naghten rule for an insanity defense.

The M'naghten rule included that a person was not guilty because of insanity if, because of a mental disorder, the defendant was not able to know her act was wrong. The court interpreted "wrong" to refer to knowledge the act was morally wrong, not knowledge that it was legally wrong. The court wrote, "The [M'Naghten] court expressly held that a defendant who knew nothing of the law would nonetheless be responsible if he know that the act was wrong, by which, therefore they must have meant, if he knew it was morally wrong... There is nothing to justify the belief that the words right and wrong, when they became limited by M'Naghten's case to the right and wrong of a particular act, cast off their meaning in terms of morals, and became terms of pure legality."

The court also wrote on knowledge of moral wrongness in the case of a delusion of a deific decree, that God ordered a criminal act, when defendant knows the act is morally and legally wrong, "It seems a mockery to say that, within the meaning of the statute, she knows that the act is wrong." The court wrote that if a person has an insane delusion that "he has a command from the Almighty to kill, it is difficult to understand how such a man can know that it is wrong for him to do so."''

References

1915 in British law
Insanity-related case law
1915 in case law
Mental health legal history of the United Kingdom
Law articles needing an infobox